Jhansi High School is in Mallapur, Telangana, India.

History
The school was established in 1980 and has classes from nursery to 10th Class through the English medium and 1st to 10th Class in Telugu.

The school took part in the training programmes on water harvesting, in 2002. The school is used as a polling station for parliamentary elections.

See also
Education in India
List of schools in India

References

External links 

Karimnagar district
High schools and secondary schools in Telangana
Educational institutions established in 1980
1980 establishments in Andhra Pradesh